A Commonwealth XI cricket team toured South Africa in October and November 1959, playing three first-class matches. Captained by Denis Compton, the Commonwealth XI included several well-known players such as Tom Graveney, Brian Close, Bert Sutcliffe, Frank Tyson, Godfrey Evans, Roy Marshall, Bob Simpson and Ian Craig.

The first match was against Transvaal at the New Wanderers Stadium in Johannesburg and this was drawn after Jonathan Fellows-Smith scored a century in each innings for Transvaal. Next, the Commonwealth XI defeated a Combined Transvaal XI by 3 wickets at the Loftus Versfeld Stadium in Pretoria. In the third and final first-class game, the Commonwealth XI played a South African Invitation XI at the New Wanderers and saved a draw after having to follow-on.

References

External links

1959 in South African cricket
1959
International cricket competitions from 1945–46 to 1960
South African cricket seasons from 1945–46 to 1969–70
October 1959 sports events in Africa
November 1959 sports events in Africa